Xinzao Station is a station of Line 4 of the Guangzhou Metro. It started operations on 26 December 2005. It is located at the underground of Zengbian Village, Xinzao Town, Panyu District. It was the terminus of Line 4 before the route between Xinzao and Huangge started in service on 30 December 2006.

Station layout

Exits

References

Railway stations in China opened in 2005
Guangzhou Metro stations in Panyu District